Bally is a surname. Notable people with the surname include:

Albert W. Bally (fl. 1988), American geologist
Charles Bally (1865–1947), Swiss linguist
Étienne Bally (1923–2018), French sprinter

See also 

 Bally (disambiguation)

surnames